Louis-Zéphirin Joncas (26 July 1846 – 28 March 1903) was a Canadian civil servant, journalist and  politician.

Born in Grande-Rivière, Lower Canada, the son of Léon Joncas and Esther Beaudin, Joncas was educated at the Collège Masson in Terrebonne and studied law in Montreal. He came back to Grande-Rivière to help his family financially and was a teacher. He later worked as an accountant, general agent, and manager of the Gaspé Fishing Company in Grande-Rivière.

From 1876 to 1887, he was the sheriff for Gaspé county. He was elected to the House of Commons of Canada for the electoral district of Gaspé in the 1887 federal election. A Conservative, he was re-elected by acclamation in the 1891 election. He did not run in the 1896 election.

From 1892 to 1897, he was also the editor of the newspaper L’Événement. In 1896, he was appointed superintendent of fisheries and game by Quebec premier Edmund James Flynn. He served in this post until his death in Quebec City in 1903.

References
 
 

1846 births
1903 deaths
Conservative Party of Canada (1867–1942) MPs
Members of the House of Commons of Canada from Quebec